The Interstate Highways in the U.S. state of West Virginia are owned and maintained by the West Virginia Division of Highways. There are 6 primary interstates, 1 auxiliary interstate, and 2 proposed interstates.

List

See also

References

 
Interstate